Agonopterix arctica is a moth of the family Depressariidae. It is found in Fennoscandia and northern Russia.

The wingspan is 15–19 mm. Adults are on wing from July to August.

The larvae feed on Salix myrsinites and Salix myrtilloides.

References

Moths described in 1902
Agonopterix
Moths of Europe